Jinhua station can refer to:
Jinhua station (Chengdu Metro), a metro station in Chengdu, China
Jinhua railway station, a railway station in Jinhua, China